William Este was  an English priest in the 16th century.

Este was educated at the University of Oxford. A Benedictine, he held the living at  St Mary Magdalen, Milk Street in the City of London; was a Canon of Windsor and Rector and Archdeacon of St Albans from 1550 until 1556.

Notes

English Benedictines
Canons of Windsor
16th-century English Roman Catholic priests
Archdeacons of St Albans
Alumni of the University of Oxford